Dancey is a surname. Notable people with the surname include:

Alfred Dancey, English murderer
David L. Dancey (1917–2008), American politician and jurist
George Henry Dancey (1865–1922), Australian artist
Ryan Dancey (born 1968), American game designer

See also
4021 Dancey, a main-belt asteroid